Top Model, cycle 9 is the ninth cycle of an ongoing reality television series based on Tyra Banks' America's Next Top Model that pits contestants from Poland against each other in a variety of competitions to determine who will win the title of the next Polish Top Model.

Joanna Krupa, who also serves as the lead judge, returned to host the ninth cycle. Other judges included fashion designer Dawid Woliński, fashion show director Kasia Sokołowska and photographer Marcin Tyszka. This is the sixth season of the show to feature male contestants.

Among the prizes for the season were a contract with Models Plus Management, an appearance on the cover of the Polish issue of Glamour, and 100,000 złotys (US$30,000).

The international destination for this cycle was Athens. The winner of the competition was 19 year-old Mikołaj Śmieszek, from Rabka Zdrój.

Contestants 
(Ages stated are at start of contest)

Episodes

Episode 1
Original airdate: 

Auditions for the ninth season of Top Model begin, and aspiring hopefuls are chosen for the semi-final round.

Silver ticket winner: Dominik Bereżański

Episode 2
Original airdate: 

In the semi-finals, the judges begin to eliminate contestants to narrow the number of models who will battle it out for a place in the top model house.

Golden ticket winner: Weronika Kaniewska

Episode 3
Original airdate: 

In the third and final casting episode of the season, the judges chose the finalists who will move onto the main competition out of the remaining pool of contestants.

Names in bold represent eliminated semi-finalists

Episode 4
Original airdate: 

Challenge winners: Gracja Kalibabka & Mikołaj Śmieszek
Immune from elimination: Agnieszka Skrzeczkowska, Dominic D'Angelica, Dominik Bereżański, Karolina Kuczyńska, Mikołaj Śmieszek, Patrycja Sobolewska & Weronika Kaniewska
First call-out: Ernest Morawski 
Bottom three: Gracja Kalibabka, Maja Siwik & Wiktoria Chorążak  
Eliminated: Wiktoria Chorążak
Featured photographer: Zosia Prominska
Special guests: Łukasz Urbański, Katarzyna Dąbrowska, Mariusz Brzozowksi, Marcin Paprocki & Marta Wojtal
Guest judge: Julia Banas

Episode 5
Original airdate: 

First challenge winners: Dominik Bereżański, Karolina Kuczyńska, Karolina Płocka, Mikołaj Śmieszek & Weronika Kaniewska
Second challenge winner: Weronika Kaniewska
First call-out: Patrycja Sobolewska
Bottom two: Dominik Bereżański & Mariusz Jakubowski
Eliminated: Dominik Bereżański
Featured photographer: Marcin Tyszka
Special guests: Katarzyna Dąbrowska, Marianna Kowalewska, Anna Gacek, Ralph Kaminski & Ola Kowal
Guest judge: Julia Wieniawa

Episode 6
Original airdate: 

Challenge winners: Dominic D'Angelica, Gracja Kalibabka, Maja Siwik & Mikołaj Śmieszek
Booked for a job: Dominic D'Angelica & Patrycja Sobolewska (APART), Mariusz Jakubowski & Weronika Kaniewska (Elle Poland), Maja Siwik & Mariusz Jakubowski (PARS)
First call-out: Mikołaj Śmieszek
Bottom three: Agnieszka Skrzeczkowska, Karolina Płocka & Łukasz Bogusławski 
Eliminated: Agnieszka Skrzeczkowska
Featured photographer: Łukasz Ziętek
Special guests: Klaudia Halejcio, Ola Nowak, Nina Nurzyńska-Mazurek, Marta Rudowicz-Drożdż, Karolina Limbbach & Peyman Amin
Guest judge: Patrycja Markowska

Episode 7
Original airdate: 

First challenge winners: Mikołaj Śmieszek & Weronika Kaniewska
Second challenge winner/Immune from elimination: Patrycja Sobolewska
Booked for a job: Ernest Morawski, Gracja Kalibabka & Weronika Kaniewska
First call-out: Dominic D'Angelica
Bottom three: Gracja Kalibabka, Karolina Kuczyńska & Łukasz Bogusławski
Eliminated: Gracja Kalibabka
Featured photographer: Szymon Brodziak
Featured cinematographer: Andrzej Belina Brzozowski
Special guests: Patrycja Piekarska, Bartek Bednorz & Joanna Jędrzejczyk
Guest judges: Anna Jagodzińska, Katarzyna Dąbrowska

Episode 8
Original airdate: 

First challenge winners: Mariusz Jakubowski & Patrycja Sobolewska
Second challenge winners: Karolina Kuczyńska & Mikołaj Śmieszek
First call-out: Mariusz Jakubowski
Bottom three: Karolina Płocka, Łukasz Bogusławski & Maja Siwik
Eliminated: Łukasz Bogusławski
Featured photographer: Marcin Tyszka, Adam Plucinski, Aga Wojtun
Special guests: Ania Jaroszewska, Ania Markowska, Dawid Woskanian, Franek Strąkowski, Hubert Gromadzki, Kasia Szklarczyk, Klaudia El Dursi, Olga Kleczkowska, Rafał Torkowski, Staszek Obolewicz, Ewa Zgrabczyńska & Magdalena Jasek
Guest judges: Małgorzata Rozenek-Majdan & Radosław Majdan

Episode 9
Original airdate: 
First challenge winners: Mariusz Jakubowski, Mikołaj Śmieszek & Weronika Kaniewska 
Second challenge winners: Ernest Morawski & Karolina Kuczyńska
First call-out: Maja Siwik & Mikołaj Śmieszek
Bottom three: Dominic D'Angelica, Karolina Kuczyńska & Patrycja Sobolewska
Eliminated: Karolina Kuczyńska & Patrycja Sobolewska
Saved: Patrycja Sobolewska
Featured photographer: Magda Łoniewska
Featured cinematographers: Anna Maliszewska, Natalia Jakubowska & Łukasz Gronowski
Special guests: Karolina Pisarek, Marta Zawiślańska & Anna Rosik
Guest judge: Anna Lewandowska

Episode 10
Original airdate: 
First challenge winners: Dominic D'Angelica & Weronika Kaniewska 
Second challenge winner: Patrycja Sobolewska
Booked for a job: Mikołaj Śmieszek (Vogue Polska)
First call-out: Mikołaj Śmieszek
Bottom three: Ernest Morawski, Mariusz Jakubowski & Karolina Płocka
Eliminated: Mariusz Jakubowski & Karolina Płocka
Featured photographers: Łukasz Dziewic (challenge), Maciej Skwara (challenge)
Special guests: Marcin Klaban, Wilson Will, Karolina Gruszecka
Guest judges: Monika "Jac" Jagaciak, Filip Niedenthal

Episode 11
Original airdate: 
Withdrew: Dominic D'Angelica & Ernest Morawski & Patrycja Sobolewska
Returned: Karolina Kuczyńska & Mariusz Jakubowski
Challenge winners: Karolina Kuczyńska & Mikołaj Śmieszek
First call-out: Mikołaj Śmieszek
Bottom two: Karolina Kuczyńska & Weronika Kaniewska
Eliminated: None
Featured photographer: Dimitris Skoulos
Special guests: Paris Valtadoros, Yiannis Togo, Lakis Gavalas, Vassilis Emmanuel Zoulias
Guest judge: Dimitris Skoulos

Episode 12
Original airdate: 
First call-out: Mikołaj Śmieszek
Bottom four: Karolina Kuczyńska, Maja Siwik, Mariusz Jakubowski & Weronika Kaniewska
Eliminated: Karolina Kuczyńska, Maja Siwik & Mariusz Jakubowski
Returned: Dominic D'Angelica & Patrycja Sobolewska
Eliminated outside of judging panel: Ernest Morawski
Featured photographer: Marcin Tyszka
Special guests: 
Guest judge: Tonia Fuseki

Episode 13
Original airdate: 

Disqualified: Dominic D'Angelica
Final three: Mikołaj Śmieszek, Patrycja Sobolewska & Weronika Kaniewska
Eliminated: Weronika Kaniewska
Final two: Mikołaj Śmieszek & Patrycja Sobolewska
Poland's Next Top Model: Mikołaj Śmieszek
Featured photographer: Filip Zwierzchowski
Special guests: Peyman Amin, Ralph Kaminski

Results 

 The contestant was immune from elimination.
 The contestant was eliminated.
 The contestant was originally eliminated but was saved.
 The contestant had to withdraw due to medical reasons.
 The contestant was part of a non-elimination bottom two
 The contestant was eliminated outside of judging panel. 
 The contestant was disqualified.
 The contestant won the competition.

Bottom Two/Three/Four 

 The contestant was eliminated after their first time in the bottom two
 The contestant was eliminated after their second time in the bottom two
 The contestant was eliminated after their third time in the bottom two
 The contestant was eliminated after their fourth time in the bottom two
 The contestant had to withdraw due to medical reasons
 The contestant was eliminated outside of judging panel
 The contestant was disqualified
 The contestant was eliminated in the final judging and placed third.
 The contestant was eliminated in the final judging and placed second.

Photo shoots
Episode 3 photo shoot: Group shots (semifinals) 
Episode 4 photo shoot: Supermarket couture
Episode 5 photo shoot: Nude in a theater
Episode 6 photo shoot: Avant-garde designs on a scaffold
Episode 7 video shoot: Fitness 
Episode 8 photo shoot: Posing with families 
Episode 9 video shoot: Underwater romance
Episode 10 photo shoot: Recreating museum paintings for Vogue Polska
Episode 11 photo shoot: Posing on a ship
Episode 12 photo shoots: Posing in Hydra Island; Editorial motion shoot
Episode 13 photo shoots: Glamour covers, Apart Jewelry campaign

Ratings

Controversy
Finalist Dominic D'Angelica was disqualified from the competition two days prior to the show's live finale due to his past criminal record of having pleaded no contest to sexual contact with a minor in the United States. Player.pl who serves as a steamer of TVN released a statement disqualifying D'Angelica from the competition.

References

 

Top Model (Polish TV series)
2018 in Polish television